Chage (born 6 January 1958, in Kokurakita-ku, Kitakyūshū, Fukuoka Prefecture) is a Japanese musician and radio personality. He dropped out from Japan University of Economics. He is also a singer-songwriter, and he is the main vocalist and lyricist-composer of Chage and Aska.

Discography

Singles

As Yuko Ishikawa and Chage

Original singles

Limited singles

Albums

Original albums

Best albums

Project albums

Limited albums

Live albums

Videography

Books, photo collections

Limited editions
 Fan clubs

 Venues, shops

Filmography
Bold' indicates that the programme is still airing

Radio

Television

Guest

Advertisements

References

External links
 Official website
 

 Record companies
 
 this deals with his released works until 2000 

 Blogs
 (25 March 2009 –) 
 (8 October – 26 December 2008) 

 Regular radio programmes
 

 Related
 
 

Japanese male singer-songwriters
Japanese singer-songwriters
Japanese male pop singers
Japanese folk singers
Japanese male composers
Universal Music Japan artists
Japanese radio personalities
Japanese photographers
People from Kitakyushu
1958 births
Living people